For people with the surname, see Brinsmade (surname).

Brinsmade is a city in Benson County, North Dakota, United States. The population was 30 at the 2020 census. Brinsmade was founded in 1889.

History
Brinsmade was platted on October 7, 1889, when a Northern Pacific Railway branch line was extended from Minnewaukan to Leeds. The village was incorporated on April 4, 1904. The city was named in honor of one Reverend S. Brinsmade.

Geography

Demographics

2010 census
As of the census of 2010, there were 35 people, 13 households, and 8 families living in the city. The racial makeup of the city was 100.0% White.

There were 13 households, of which 46.2% had children under the age of 18 living with them, 38.5% were married couples living together, 15.4% had a female householder with no husband present, 7.7% had a male householder with no wife present, and 38.5% were non-families. 23.1% of all households were made up of individuals, and 7.7% had someone living alone who was 65 years of age or older. The average household size was 2.69 and the average family size was 2.50.

The median age in the city was 33.3 years. 40% of residents were under the age of 18; 0.0% were between the ages of 18 and 24; 31.5% were from 25 to 44; 25.7% were from 45 to 64; and 2.9% were 65 years of age or older. The gender makeup of the city was 42.9% male and 57.1% female.

2000 census
As of the census of 2000, there were 29 people, 14 households and 9 families living in the city. The population density was 129.4 per square mile (50.9/km). There were 24 housing units at an average density of 107.1 per square mile (42.1/km). The racial makeup of the city was 100.00% White.

There were 14 households, of which 21.4% had children under the age of 18 living with them, 64.3% were married couples living together, and 35.7% were non-families. 35.7% of all households were made up of individuals, and none had someone living alone who was 65 years of age or older. The average household size was 2.07 and the average family size was 2.67.

17.2% of the population were under the age of 18, 3.4% from 18 to 24, 37.9% from 25 to 44, 20.7% from 45 to 64, and 20.7% who were 65 years of age or older. The median age was 40 years. For every 100 females, there were 93.3 males. For every 100 females age 18 and over, there were 118.2 males.

The median household income was $30,500 and the median family income was $30,625. Males had a median income of $21,250 versus $11,250 for females. The per capita income for the city was $14,100. None of the population and none of the families were below the poverty line.

Education
It is in Leeds School District 6.

In fiction
Brinsmade was the scene of a battle between the US Army and a UFO in the 2002 TV miniseries Taken, produced by Steven Spielberg.

References

External links

Cities in Benson County, North Dakota
Cities in North Dakota
Populated places established in 1889
1889 establishments in Dakota Territory